Antonio Banks may refer to:

 Montel Vontavious Porter (born 1973), American wrestler and rapper, also known as Antonio Banks
 Antonio Banks (American football) (born 1973), American football cornerback